Gambler was a Polish monthly video game magazine published between 1993–1999 by the Lupus publishing house. The magazine was partly created by former employees of  Top Secret, similar to the formation of Secret Service and Reset. In 2017, Gambler was reactivated as a website.

References

External links
 

1993 establishments in Poland
1999 disestablishments in Poland
Defunct computer magazines
Defunct magazines published in Poland
Home computer magazines
Magazines established in 1993
Magazines disestablished in 1999
Monthly magazines published in Poland
Polish-language magazines
Video game magazines published in Poland